Philip Levine (January 10, 1928 – February 14, 2015) was an American poet best known for his poems about working-class Detroit. He taught for more than thirty years in the English department of California State University, Fresno and held teaching positions at other universities as well. He served on the Board of Chancellors of the Academy of American Poets from 2000 to 2006, and was appointed Poet Laureate of the United States for 2011–2012.

Biography
Philip Levine grew up in industrial Detroit, the second of three sons and the first of identical twins of Jewish immigrant parents. His father, Harry Levine, owned a used auto parts business, his mother, Esther Priscol (Pryszkulnik) Levine, was a bookseller. When Levine was five years old, his father died. While growing up, he faced the anti-Semitism embodied by Father Coughlin, the pro-Nazi radio priest. 
In high school, a teacher told him, “You write like an angel. Why don't you think about becoming a writer?“ At this point, he was already working at night in auto factories, though just 14 years old. Detroit Central High School graduated him in 1946, and he went to college at Wayne University (now Wayne State University) in Detroit, where he began to write poetry, encouraged by his mother, to whom he dedicated the book of poems The Mercy. Levine earned his A.B. in 1950 and went to work for Chevrolet and Cadillac in what he called "stupid jobs." The work, he later wrote, was “so heavy and monotonous that after an hour or two I was sure each night that I would never last the shift.”

He married his first wife, Patty Kanterman, in 1951. The marriage lasted until 1953.

In 1953, he attended the University of Iowa without registering, studying with, among others, poets Robert Lowell and John Berryman, the latter of whom Levine called his "one great mentor."

In 1954, he earned a mail-order master's degree with a thesis on John Keats' "Ode to Indolence," and married actress Frances J. Artley.

He returned to the University of Iowa teaching technical writing, and completed his Master of Fine Arts degree in 1957. The same year, he was awarded the Jones Fellowship in Poetry at Stanford University. In 1958, he joined the English department at California State University, Fresno, where he taught until his retirement in 1992. He also taught at many other universities, among them New York University as Distinguished Writer-in-Residence, Columbia, Princeton, Brown, Tufts, Vanderbilt, and the University of California, Berkeley.

Levine and his wife had made their homes in Fresno and Brooklyn Heights. He died of pancreatic cancer on February 14, 2015, age 87.

Work
The familial, social, and economic world of twentieth-century Detroit is one of the major subjects of Levine's work. His portraits of working class Americans and his continuous examination of his Jewish immigrant inheritance (both based on real life and described through fictional characters) has left a testimony of mid-twentieth century American life.
 
Levine's working experience lent his poetry a profound skepticism with regard to conventional American ideals. In his first two books, On the Edge (1963) and Not This Pig (1968), the poetry dwells on those who suddenly become aware that they are trapped in some murderous processes not of their own making. In 1968, Levine signed the “Writers and Editors War Tax Protest” pledge, vowing to refuse to make tax payments in protest against the Vietnam War.

In his first two books, Levine was somewhat traditional in form and relatively constrained in expression. Beginning with They Feed They Lion, typically Levine's poems are free-verse monologues tending toward trimeter or tetrameter. The music of Levine's poetry depends on tension between his line-breaks and his syntax. The title poem of Levine's book 1933 (1974) is an example of the cascade of clauses and phrases one finds in his poetry. Other collections include The Names of the Lost, A Walk with Tom Jefferson, New Selected Poems, and the National Book Award-winning What Work Is.

On November 29, 2007 a tribute was held in New York City in anticipation of Levine's eightieth birthday. Among those celebrating Levine's career by reading Levine's work were Yusef Komunyakaa, Galway Kinnell, E. L. Doctorow, Charles Wright, Jean Valentine and Sharon Olds. Levine read several new poems as well.

Near the end of his life, Levine, an avid jazz aficionado, collaborated with jazz saxophonist and composer Benjamin Boone  on the melding of his poetry and narration with music. The resulting CD, “The Poetry of Jazz” (Origin Records 82754), was released posthumously on March 16, 2018. It contains fourteen of Levine's poems and performances by Levine and Boone as well as jazz greats Chris Potter, Greg Osby, and Tom Harrell .

Awards
1973 American Academy of Arts and Letters Award, Frank O'Hara Prize,  Guggenheim Foundation fellowship
1977 Lenore Marshall Poetry Prize from the Academy of American Poets– The Names of the Lost (1975)
1978 Harriet Monroe Memorial Prize from Poetry
1979 National Book Critics Circle Award – Ashes: Poems New and Old – 7 Years from Somewhere
1980 Guggenheim Foundation Fellowship
1980 National Book Award for Poetry – Ashes: Poems New and Old
1981 Levinson Prize from Poetry magazine
1987 Ruth Lilly Poetry Prize from the Modern Poetry Association and the American Council for the Arts
1991 National Book Award for Poetry and Los Angeles Times Book Prize  – What Work Is
1995 Pulitzer Prize for Poetry – The Simple Truth (1994)
2011 Appointed Poet Laureate Consultant in Poetry to the Library of Congress (United States Poet Laureate)
2013 Academy of American Poets Wallace Stevens Award

Bibliography

Poetry 
Collections
On the Edge, Stone Wall Press, 1963 
On the Edge, A Second Press, 1964 
Not This Pig, Wesleyan University Press, 1968, ; Wesleyan University Press, 1982, 
Pili's Wall, Unicorn Press, 1971; Unicorn Press, 1980
Red Dust (1971)
They Feed They Lion, Atheneum, 1972
1933, Atheneum, 1974, 
The Names of the Lost, Atheneum, 1976
Ashes: Poems New and Old, Atheneum, 1979, 
7 Years From Somewhere, Atheneum, 1979, 
One for the Rose, Atheneum, 1981, 
Selected Poems, Atheneum, 1984, 
Sweet Will, Atheneum, 1985, 
A Walk With Tom Jefferson, Knopf, 1988, 
New Selected Poems, Knopf, 1991, 
What Work Is, Knopf, 1991, 
The Simple Truth, Knopf, 1994, ; Knopf, 1996, 
Unselected Poems, Greenhouse Review Press, 1997, 
The Mercy, Random House, 1999, 
Breath Knopf, 2004, ; reprint, Random House, Inc., 2006, 
Stranger to Nothing: Selected Poems, Bloodaxe Books, UK, 2006, 
 News of the World, Random House, 2009, 
 The Last Shift, Random House, Inc., 2016, published posthumously, edited by Edward Hirsch

Translations
Tarumba: The Selected Poems of Jaime Sabines, edited and translated with Ernesto Trejo (1979)
Off the Map: Selected Poems of Gloria Fuertes, edited and translated with Ada Long (1984)

Albums
The Poetry of Jazz, Origin Records, 2018, 
The Poetry of Jazz Volume Two, Origin Records, 2019,

Essays
The Bread of Time (1994)
My Lost Poets (2016)

Interviews
 "Interlochen Center for the Arts", Interview with Interlochen Arts Academy students on March 17, 1977.
Don't Ask, University of Michigan Press, 1981, 
 Moyers & Company, on December 29, 2013, Philip Levine reads some of his poetry and explores how his years working on Detroit's assembly lines inspired his poetry.

References

External links

2012 Levine interview at Words on a Wire
Phillip Levine on America's Workers, Moyers & Company, December 27, 2013
Correspondence with Gerald Stern

1928 births
2015 deaths
20th-century American poets
21st-century American poets
American Poets Laureate
American academics of English literature
California State University, Fresno faculty
Iowa Writers' Workshop alumni
Jewish American poets
Members of the American Academy of Arts and Letters
National Book Award winners
New York University faculty
Poets from California
Pulitzer Prize for Poetry winners
The New Yorker people
University of Houston faculty
Wayne State University alumni
Writers from Detroit
20th-century American non-fiction writers
21st-century American non-fiction writers
People from Brooklyn Heights
Central High School (Detroit) alumni
21st-century American Jews